Belgian Airman was a 6,959-ton cargo ship which was built by Harland & Wolff Ltd, Glasgow in 1941 for the Ministry of War Transport (MoWT). She was launched as Empire Ballantyne and transferred to the Belgian Government in 1942. She was sunk by a German U-boat on 14 April 1945.

History
Empire Ballantyne was built by Harland & Wolff Ltd, Glasgow as yard number 1093. She was launched on 21 October 1941 and completed in February 1942. She was built for the MoWT and was to have been operated under the management of W A Souter & Co Ltd, Newcastle upon Tyne. On 15 February 1942 she was transferred to the Régie de la Marine of the Belgian Government and renamed Belgian Airman. She was managed by Compagnie Maritime Belge, Antwerp.

The survivors were landed in Bermuda.

Belgian Airman was a member of a number of convoys during the Second World War.

ON 162

Convoy ON 162 sailed from Liverpool on 12 January 1943 and arrived at New York on 11 February. Belgian Airman was carrying the Commodore, Captain H.C. Birnie, RNR.

HX 228

Convoy HX 228 sailed from New York on 28 February 1943 and arrived at Liverpool on  15 March. Belgian Airman was one of the ships that detached from the convoy and proceeded to Halifax, Nova Scotia in order to reduce the size of the convoy to 60 ships.

HX 229A

Convoy HX 229A which from New York on 9 March 1943 and arrived at Liverpool on 26 March. Belgian Airman joined at Halifax on 12 March. During the voyage, Belgian Airman was damaged by ice and diverted to Reykjavík, Iceland. She was carrying a cargo of steel and timber.

SL 136

Convoy SL 136 sailed from Freetown, Sierra Leone on 3 September 1943 and arrived at Liverpool on 23 September. Belgian Airman was destined for Loch Ewe.

Sinking
On 8 April 1945, Belgian Airman departed Houston, bound for New York and Antwerp. She was carrying a cargo of sorghum and dairy feed. At 15:50 CET, on 14 April 1945, Belgian Airman was torpedoed and sunk off Chesapeake Bay, Maryland. One crew member was killed. The 46 survivors were rescued by the Liberty ship . The survivors were landed at New York.

The fate of the U-857 is unknown. It disappeared in the Atlantic in April, 1945. One theory is that it was sunk by a US Navy Airship with a Mk 24 FIDO Air-Dropped ASW Homing Torpedo.

Official number and code letters
Official Numbers were a forerunner to IMO Numbers.

Empire Ballantyne had the UK Official Number 168706 and the Code Letters BCHQ were allocated to her.

References

Ships built on the River Clyde
1941 ships
Ministry of War Transport ships
World War II merchant ships of Belgium
World War II shipwrecks in the Atlantic Ocean
Ships sunk by German submarines in World War II
Maritime incidents in April 1945
Shipwrecks of the Carolina coast
Ships built by Harland and Wolff